Gwenllian of Gwynedd may refer to:

Gwenllian ferch Gruffydd
Gwenllian ferch Llywelyn

cy:Y Dywysoges Gwenllian